Savigneux may refer to the following places in France:

 Savigneux, Ain, a commune in the department of Ain
 Savigneux, Loire, a commune in the department of Loire